The Worrell–Ettlinger House is a historic Craftsman-style bungalow built in 1912 in Austin, Texas.

The home is located at 3110 Harris Park Avenue. It was added to the National Register of Historic Places on October 12, 2004.

References

Houses on the National Register of Historic Places in Texas
Houses in Austin, Texas
National Register of Historic Places in Austin, Texas
City of Austin Historic Landmarks